The 3000 is a racing sailing dinghy crewed by two persons with a trapeze for the crew. Launched in 1996 as the Laser 3000, the 3000 was developed from the Laser 2, using the original Frank Bethwaite-designed planing hull combined with a new designed self-draining deck by Derek Clark. Clark also re-designed the rig, using spars and sails from premium proprietary sources and replacing the symmetric spinnaker of the Laser 2 by a larger asymmetric spinnaker (gennaker). The gennaker is chute-launched and retrieved using a single halyard line, and is set on a retractable bowsprit. Helm balance and handling were improved using a shorter-footed mainsail with two full-width battens giving a larger roach. A mast with conventional spreaders replaced the now-unusual diamond arrangement of the Laser 2.

The 3000 offers fast, exciting yet easy sailing, particularly for lighter sailors - couples, parent-child and teenage combinations are common at 3000 events. A modest rig size and forgiving nature means that if other classes are sailing on a windy day, any reasonably competently crewed 3000 will be able to join them and enjoy a sparkling sail.

The 3000 class organises racing for both the original boats built by Laser alongside boats sometimes tagged 'V3000' and currently built to the same design by VanderCraft. The latter are constructed from woven glass and epoxy resin using vacuum-bagging to produce a boat which is very stiff and light yet durable.

The mast on current boats uses externally run rigging to enable their being sealed and thus buoyant, reducing any tendency for the boat to invert in a capsize. Other innovations introduced with the boats included a centrally mounted bowsprit, a compression-strut kicker or 'Gnav' in place of the conventional kicking strap or boom vang, and ‘off-the-boom’ sheeting with a take-off block at mid-boom fed from an aft bridle. The latter two rigging variations give considerably more room in the boat for the crew members, and remove any objections levelled at the original boats of being cramped due to their centre-bridle and conventional kicker. The class rules permit all variations introduced since the original Laser 3000 to be retro-fitted to existing boats, which can generally be done with minimal trouble or expense.

While the original Hyde sails from Laser have proved to be still competitive, North Sails now offer an alternative using the latest cloth technology. North jibs are somewhat larger and require mounting right at the bow; a furlable Dacron jib is offered, as well as a Mylar jib which is battened and a little larger still.

The boat is easy to sail singlehanded, optionally using the jib, gennaker and/or trapeze, the latter being easy to use thanks to the deck layout and lack of racks. Most boats are sailed two-up, however, and class events presently cater for this crew format. The class association organises open meetings, including a national championships and, recently, coaching days. The atmosphere at all these events is friendly, with advice available for newcomers.

Vital statistics 

Dimensions
Length 4.40m
Beam 1.46m
Mast Height 6.02m

Sail areas
Mainsail 8.60m²
Jib 3.2m²
Gennaker 12.80m²

Weights
Hull 54 kg
Trolley 28 kg
Trailer 45 kg

Portsmouth Yardstick Number: 1085 for Laser 3000; Class recommended 1007 for Vandercraft

National Champions

Youth Champions 
The following are the Youth Champions (U18) for the 3000 Class who compete in the same event

References

External links
UK 3000 Class Association Web Site
Builder’s (VanderCraft) Web Site
Sailing Test of the Vandercraft 3000
Photo gallery

Dinghies
Two-person sailboats